Kalyn Keller (born April 3, 1985) is an American former competition swimmer who represented the United States at the 2004 Summer Olympics in Athens, Greece.  She competed in the women's 800-meter freestyle, and finished fourth with a time of 8:26.97 in the event final.  In the women's 400-meter freestyle, she swam in the preliminary heats and recorded the tenth-best overall time of 4:09.83.

She attended high school at Arcadia High School in Phoenix, Arizona.

She is the younger sister of American swimmer Klete Keller, who was also a member of the 2004 U.S. Olympic team.

She competed in her collegiate career at the University of Southern California, leaving during her senior season to begin competing for Club Wolverine.

Shortly before the 2008 Olympics, Keller retired from swimming in order to battle Crohn's disease. Keller served as a commentator and reporter during the 2008 United States Olympic Swimming Trials.

She married Keenan Robinson in October 2012 in Birmingham, Michigan. Robinson has served as a head athletic trainer for team USA swimming, including during the 2012 Summer Olympics and 2016 Summer Olympics.

See also
 List of University of Southern California people

References

External links
 
 
 

1985 births
Living people
Analysts of the Defense Intelligence Agency
American female freestyle swimmers
Female long-distance swimmers
Olympic swimmers of the United States
Sportspeople from Phoenix, Arizona
Swimmers at the 1999 Pan American Games
Swimmers at the 2004 Summer Olympics
USC Trojans women's swimmers
World Aquatics Championships medalists in open water swimming
Pan American Games bronze medalists for the United States
Pan American Games medalists in swimming
Medalists at the 1999 Pan American Games